Volume expansion may refer to:

 Thermal expansion
 Hypervolemia, an abnormally high level of fluid in the blood